Anthomyia cannabina is a species of fly in the family Anthomyiidae. It is found in the  Palearctic. Identification of Anthomyia cannabina is described in Bei-Bienko & Steyskal 1988.

References

Anthomyiidae
Insects described in 1916
Brachyceran flies of Europe